is a Prefectural Natural Park in northwest Kumamoto Prefecture, Japan. Established in 1955, the park spans the municipalities of Arao, Nankan, and Tamana. The park derives its name from Mount Shōtai and encompasses Akada pond.

See also
 National Parks of Japan

References

External links
  Map of Natural Parks of Kumamoto Prefecture

Parks and gardens in Kumamoto Prefecture
Protected areas established in 1955
1955 establishments in Japan